The 2004 County Championship season, known as the Frizzell County Championship for sponsorship reasons, was contested through two divisions: Division One and Division Two. Each team plays all the others in their division both home and away. The top three teams from Division Two were promoted to the first division for 2005, while the bottom three sides from Division 1 are relegated.

Teams
Teams in the County Championship 2004:

Points system

12 points for a win
6 points for a tie
4 points for a draw
4 points for an abandoned game
A maximum of 5 batting bonus points and 3 bowling bonus points

Division One

Standings

Division Two

Standings

Results summary

Division One

Records

See also
 2004 English cricket season
2004 Cheltenham & Gloucester Trophy
2004 Totesport League
2004 Twenty20 Cup

References

County Championship seasons
County Championship